David Blair (born October 15, 1991) is a Canadian pararower and paratriathlete who competes in international-level events. He represented Canada at the 2012 Summer Paralympics in the Mixed coxed four, and is a world champion in the event. Born with albinism, Blair's vision started poor and slowly deteriorated.

References

External links
 
 
 

1991 births
Living people
Canadian male triathletes
Paratriathletes of Canada
Paralympic rowers of Canada
Rowers at the 2012 Summer Paralympics